Amicale de Lucé is a French football club based in Lucé.

The club played in the second division from 1976 to 1980. They reached the last 16 of the Coupe de France in 1978.

Honours 
 Champion of Division 3 Groupe Centre : 1976
 Champion of Centre de Division d'Honneur : 1979

Luce
Sport in Eure-et-Loir
Association football clubs established in 1938
1938 establishments in France
Football clubs in Centre-Val de Loire